Topolovec is a place name that may refer to:

Places in Croatia
Topolovec, Vrbovec, a settlement in Croatia

Places in Slovenia
Topolovec, Koper, a settlement in southwestern Slovenia
Topolovec, Šmarje pri Jelšah, a settlement in eastern Slovenia